Nicholas Maton (born February 18, 1997) is an American professional baseball utility player for the Detroit Tigers of Major League Baseball (MLB). He played college baseball at Eastern Illinois University and Lincoln Land Community College. Maton was selected by the Philadelphia Phillies in the seventh round of the 2017 Major League Baseball draft, and made his MLB debut with them in 2021.

Early life and amateur career
Maton was born and grew up in Chatham, Illinois, and attended Glenwood High School. He was a four-year starter on the Titans baseball team and was named first team All-State and the Central State Eight Conference Player of the Year as a senior after batting .442 with 28 RBIs, 45 runs scored and 20 stolen bases while also going 8–1 as a pitcher with a 0.95 ERA and 102 strikeouts in 59 innings pitched. Maton was selected in the 40th round of the  2015 Major League Baseball draft by the Oakland Athletics but opted not to sign with the team and instead play college baseball at Eastern Illinois University.

Maton played as the Panthers starting shortstop as a true freshman, batting .299 with 12 doubles, four triples and three home runs with 28 runs scored and 24 runs driven in and was named to the Ohio Valley Conference All-Freshman team. After the season Maton played collegiate summer baseball for the Fayetteville SwampDogs of the Coastal Plain League, where he batted .175 with two doubles and 15 RBIs. He transferred to Lincoln Land Community College after his freshman year. In his only season with the Loggers, Maton batted .408 with eight home runs, 46 RBIs, 60 runs scored and 33 stolen bases while also posting a 4–1 record in thirteen appearances as a pitcher and initially committed to continue his collegiate baseball career at Missouri. Maton was selected by the Philadelphia Phillies in the seventh round of the 2017 Major League Baseball draft and signed with the team.

Professional career

Philadelphia Phillies
Maton was assigned to the short-season Williamsport Crosscutters to begin his professional career, where he batted .252 with two home runs, 13 RBIs and 34 runs scored and stole ten bases in 58 games. He played for the Class A Lakewood BlueClaws in 2018, hitting for a .256 average with eight home runs and 51 RBI's in 114 games and was a South Atlantic League All-Star. Maton was assigned to the Class A-Advanced Clearwater Threshers to start the 2019 season and posted a .276 batting average with five home runs, 14 doubles and 45 RBIs and was named a Florida State League All-Star before earning a promotion to the Double-A Reading Fightin Phils for the rest of the season. He hit .210 with two home runs in 21 games with Reading. After the season, Maton was selected by the Phillies to play in the Arizona Fall League for the Scottsdale Scorpions. Maton was invited to Spring Training by the Phillies in 2020 and was named one of the Phillies top 10 prospects for 2020 by Baseball America. He did not play a minor league game in 2020 due to the cancellation of the minor league season caused by the COVID-19 pandemic.

The Phillies added Maton to their 40-man roster after the 2020 season. After being assigned to the team's alternate training site to start the 2021 season, Maton was promoted to the Phillies on April 19, 2021. He made his MLB debut that night as the starting shortstop against the San Francisco Giants, and collected his first major league hit, a single off of Giants starter Kevin Gausman. Maton began his career with a six-game hitting streak, with multiple hits in each of the final four games. He hit the first and second home runs of his MLB career on May 16, 2021, in a game against the Toronto Blue Jays.

On August 23, 2022, Maton recorded his first walk-off hit against the Cincinnati Reds off pitcher Alexis Díaz. 

In the 2022 regular season with the Phillies, he batted .250/.341/.514 in 72 at bats with five home runs and 17 RBIs. He played 10 games each in left field, right field, and at second base, and two games each at shortstop, third base, and pitcher.

Detroit Tigers
On January 7, 2023, Maton, Matt Vierling, and Donny Sands were traded to the Detroit Tigers in exchange for Gregory Soto and Kody Clemens.

Personal life
Maton is the younger brother of Houston Astros pitcher Phil Maton.

References

External links

Eastern Illinois Panthers bio
Lincoln Land Loggers bio

1997 births
Living people
Baseball players from Illinois
Clearwater Threshers players
Eastern Illinois Panthers baseball players
Lakewood BlueClaws players
Lincoln Land Loggers baseball players
Major League Baseball infielders
People from Sangamon County, Illinois
Philadelphia Phillies players
Reading Fightin Phils players
Scottsdale Scorpions players
Williamsport Crosscutters players
Lehigh Valley IronPigs players